Witonia  is a village in Łęczyca County, Łódź Voivodeship, in central Poland. It is the seat of the gmina (administrative district) called Gmina Witonia.

The village has a population of 1,130.

References

Witonia